Angelo Mancuso is an Italian former politician.

Born in Caltagirone on 28 November 1928, Mancuso was a trade unionist and journalist who served in the ninth Italian Legislature as member of the Chamber of Deputies. He was associated with the Italian Communist Party and the Independent Left.

References

1928 births
Living people
Italian Communist Party politicians
20th-century Italian journalists
Deputies of Legislature IX of Italy
Italian trade unionists
People from Caltagirone